On June 19, 2007, the Vatican, under the direction of Pope Benedict XVI and Cardinal Renato Martino, issued a 36-page document entitled Guidelines for the Pastoral Care of the Road, created by the curial Pontifical Council for Migrants and Itinerant People, under the leadership of Renato Raffaele Cardinal Martino, and intended for bishop conferences around the world.  The document specifically states that it is aimed at bishops, priests, religious and other pastoral workers in hopes of pastoral caregivers paying greater attention to expressions of human mobility. The document derived some of its material from the Old Testament, the New Testament, the American Automobile Association, and statements by Popes Pius XII, John XXIII, Paul VI and John Paul II.

On its issue this document received a lot of media attention due to its listing of Ten Commandments for Drivers.  In essence, the Vatican is pointing out that the act of driving has a moral and ethical component. The Guidelines make note of both the benefits of the use of automobiles as well as its dangerous and negative consequences. The problem is not as pervasive in the Vatican City itself, which has a speed limit of 30 km/h (18-19 mph) and approximately only 1000 cars; but there were over 35 million deaths resulting from car accidents in the 20th century, and the Vatican is responding. In the same section of the document as the Drivers' Ten Commandments are the so-called Christian virtues of drivers, which include prudence, justice and hope.

The Guidelines not only deal with problems on the road, but also address prostitution, caring for street children and the homeless, found in Parts Two, Three and Four of the Guidelines.

The Guidelines state that driving can bring out primitive behavior in drivers, which leads to road rage, rude gestures, speeding, drinking behind the wheel, cursing, blasphemy, impoliteness, and intentional violation of the highway code.  The Guidelines encourage drivers to obey the highway code, pray behind the wheel and recite the rosary, which the Guidelines insist would not distract the driver's attention.

List 10 of Commandments for drivers
The following are the ten commandments for drivers.

References 

Driving
2007 documents
2007 in Christianity
Codes of conduct
Documents of the Roman Curia
Pontifical Council for the Pastoral Care of Migrants and Itinerants